Frederick Raymond Kommers (March 31, 1886 – June 14, 1943) nicknamed "Bugs", was a professional baseball outfielder. Kommers played two seasons in the Major League Baseball. He debuted in June  for the Pittsburgh Pirates and played 40 games for them over the rest of the season. In , he split the season between two teams in the new Federal League, starting the year with the St. Louis Terriers and ending it with the Baltimore Terrapins.

Sources

Major League Baseball outfielders
Pittsburgh Pirates players
St. Louis Terriers players
Baltimore Terrapins players
Havana Perfectos players
Beardstown Infants players
Galesburg Pavers players
Springfield Senators players
Decatur Nomads players
Columbus Senators players
Springfield Watchmakers players
Dubuque Dubs players
Jackson/Ionia Mayors players
Muskegon Muskies players
1886 births
1943 deaths
Baseball players from Chicago